L'incoronazione di Dario (RV 719) is a dramma per musica by Antonio Vivaldi with an Italian libretto by Adriano Morselli. The opera was first performed at the Teatro Sant'Angelo in Venice on 23 January 1717.

Roles

Recordings
 1986 John Elwes, Gérard Lesne, Henri Ledroit, Michel Verschaeve, Ensemble Baroque de Nice dir. Gilbert Bezzina. Harmonia Mundi. HMA 1901235-37.
 2014 Anders J. Dahlin, Sara Mingardo, Delphine Galou, Riccardo Novaro, Accademia Bizantia. Ottavio Dantone. Naïve Records. B00IGD7OE8.

References

External links

1717 operas
Operas by Antonio Vivaldi
Italian-language operas
Operas
Opera seria